Dante is a station of the Turin Metro. The station was opened on 6 March 2011 as part of the Line 1 extension from Porta Nuova to Lingotto.
It is in the busy, commercial district of central Torino, on the Piazza Edmondo De Amicis, near the intersection with Corso Dante Alighieri and Via Nizza. It is located within walking distance to the Castello del Valentino as well as the medical center of Torino, including the CTO Orthopedic Hospital.

Services 
 Ticket vending machines
 Handicap accessibility
 Elevators
 Escalators
 Active CCTV surveillance

References

Turin Metro stations
Railway stations opened in 2011
2011 establishments in Italy
Railway stations in Italy opened in the 21st century